Dagmara Nocuń (born 2 January 1996) is a Polish handballer for MKS Selgros Lublin and the Polish national team.

She represented Poland at the 2020 European Women's Handball Championship.

Achievements
Mistrzostwa Polski:
Winner: 2015

References

External links

1996 births
Living people
People from Kolno
Polish female handball players
21st-century Polish women